The Meiningen Ensemble, also known as the Meiningen Company, was the court theatre of the German state of Saxe-Meiningen, led by George II, Duke of Saxe-Meiningen. Its principal director was Ludwig Chronegk. The Ensemble was a great influence on Ibsen, Antoine, and Stanislavski.

The Duke admired Charles Kean's attempts to stage Shakespeare's plays in a manner that was historically accurate for the place and period in which each drama was set. The Ensemble that he created, which toured Germany and Europe in 1874–1890, became famous across Europe for its detailed, archeologically authentic reproductions of locations and its realistic, fully individuated crowd scenes. Its productions offered a model of an integrated, unified theatrical aesthetic and a demonstration of the potential of a tightly controlled, director-focused mode of theatre-making.

Notes

Further reading

19th-century theatre
Theatre companies in Germany
Culture in Meiningen